Zinowiewia is a genus of plants in the family Celastraceae.

Species include: 
 Zinowiewia concinna
 Zinowiewia costaricensis Lundell
 Zinowiewia madsenii C.Ulloa & P.Jørg.
 Zinowiewia micrantha Lundell

 
Celastrales genera
Taxonomy articles created by Polbot
Taxa named by Nikolai Turczaninow